Tliltocatl sabulosus (synonym Brachypelma sabulosum) is a species of spider in the family Theraphosidae (tarantulas), found in Guatemala.

Description
Tliltocatl sabulosus is a large tarantula, females having a total body length of around 65–70 mm. The fourth leg is the longest at around 75 mm. It is generally black in colour, with scattered red hairs on the abdomen.

Taxonomy
Tliltocatl sabulosus was first described, as Eurypelma sabulosum, by F. O. Pickard-Cambridge in 1897. It was transferred to the genus Brachypelma in 1989. In 2019, it was proposed that it be moved to the new genus Tliltocatl; this has been accepted by the World Spider Catalog.

Distribution
Tliltocatl sabulosus was originally collected around Tikal in northern Guatemala.

Conservation
All species of Brachypelma, then including Tliltocatl, including T. sabulosus, were placed on CITES Appendix II in 1994, thus restricting trade.

References

External links
 – photographs taken in the wild

Theraphosidae
Spiders of Central America
Spiders described in 1897